The AIRMARINE Cup 2019 is the first edition of the AIRMARINE Cup, an international football tournament with four countries participating. It is played on 20 and 23 March 2019 in Kuala Lumpur, Malaysia. Ananth S. Nathan, Executive Chairman of AIRMARINE (Malaysia) Sdn. Bhd. takes the tournament as a national social responsibility of a corporate entity to step forward for the Malaysian national football team to gain more international break for the exposure and to advance in their FIFA ranking points.

Faiz Nasir, made his first international goal debut in the Malaysia versus Afghanistan.

Oman won the tournament after beating Singapore 5–4 through penalty shoot-out for their first title.

Participating nations 
In earlier February 2019, it was announced that Oman,
Singapore and Solomon Islands had been invited to participated in the 2019 Airmarine Cup hosted by the Football Association of Malaysia (FAM). On 1 March 2019, Solomon Islands announcing their withdrawal as the tournament date is coinciding with their league schedule, leading FAM to calling Afghanistan as a potential replacement candidate. The same day, Afghanistan confirmed their participation and the draw are being announced on 4 March.

Match officials 
The following referees and their assistants were chosen for the tournament.

Referees

  Yudi Nurcahya
  Nazmi Nasaruddin
  Suhaizi Shukri
  Chaireag Ngamsom

Assistant referees

  Hariff Akhir
  Shahreen Che Omar
  Apichit Nophuan
  Poonsawat Samransuk

Matches 
All times are local, Malaysian Standard Time (MST) (UTC+8).

Bracket

Semi-finals

Third-place playoff

Final

Goalscorers 
2 goals

  Abdul Aziz Al-Muqbali

1 goal

  Faysal Shayesteh
  Faiz Nasir
  Musallam Akaak
  Mohammed Al-Balushi
  Ahmed Mubarak Al-Mahaijri
  Raed Ibrahim Saleh
  Faris Ramli
  Zulfahmi Arifin

1 own goal

  Abassin Alikhil (playing against Malaysia)

References

External links 
 
 

International association football competitions hosted by Malaysia
2019 in association football
2019 in Malaysian football
March 2019 sports events in Malaysia